Judge Billings may refer to:

Edward Coke Billings (1829–1893), judge of the United States District Court for the District of Louisiana and the Eastern District of Louisiana
Franklin S. Billings Jr. (1922–2014), judge of the United States District Court for the District of Vermont
Judith Billings (born 1943), judge of the Utah Court of Appeals

See also
Justice Billings (disambiguation)